Hayward is a surname. Notable people with the surname include:

A. E. Hayward (1884–1939), American cartoonist
Abraham Hayward (1801–1884), English writer and essayist
Adam Hayward (born 1984), American football player
Alvinza Hayward (1822–1904), gold mining millionaire
Ashton Hayward 58th mayor of Pensacola, president of the Andrews Research and Education Foundation
Basil Hayward (1928–1989) English footballer and manager
Bill Hayward (1868–1947), American track and field coach
Bob Hayward (1927–1961), Canadian powerboat racer
Brian Hayward, Canadian ice hockey player
Bronwyn Hayward, New Zealand political scientist
Brooke Hayward, American actress and author
Bruce W. Hayward (born 1950), New Zealand geologist, marine ecologist, and author
Byron Hayward, Welsh international rugby union player
Captain Hayward, English sailor
Carolyn Hayward, Canadian bullfighter and artist
Chard Hayward, Welsh actor
Charles Hayward (musician), 25th mayor of Victoria, British Columbia (1900–1902)
Charles Hayward (musician), English musician
Charles William Hayward (1892–1983), British entrepreneur and philanthropist
Charlie Hayward, American bass guitarist
Charlotte Hayward (Charlotte Oelschlagel, 1898–1984), professional German skater
Chris Hayward (1925–2006), American television writer and producer
Chuck Hayward (1920–1998), American actor and stuntman
Daniel Hayward (1808–1852), English cricketer
Don Hayward (1925–1999), Welsh international rugby union player
Edward Hayward (1903–1983), Australian businessman
Eric Hayward, English professional footballer
Evan Hayward (1876–1968), English Liberal M.P. for South East Durham (1910–1918)
Ferd Hayward (1911–1988), Canadian long-distance walker
Florence Hayward (1858–1939), a South Australian poet, pen name "Firenze"
Florence Hayward (writer), St. Louis author
Francesca Hayward, Kenyan-born English ballet dancer and actress
George Hayward (rugby union), Welsh international rugby union player
George S. L. Hayward (1894–1924), British World War I aviator and Military Cross recipient
George W. Hayward (1840–1870), British explorer
George Simpson-Hayward, English cricketer
Gordon Hayward (born 1990), American basketball player
Gordon Hayward (cricketer), (1926–2014), English cricketer
Harry T. Hayward (1865–1895), American gambler and suspected serial killer
Hilda Hayward (1898 - 1970), New Zealand pioneer filmmaker
Sir Isaac Hayward, leader of London County Council (1947–1965)
Sir Jack Hayward, English property developer
Jack Hayward (academic), English writer and academic
James Hayward (artist), English military historian
James Hayward (artist), born 1943
 Jimmy Hayward, American animation director
 Jocquim Hayward Stocqueler (1801–1886), British journalist
 Joel Hayward, New Zealand-born academic and poet
 John Hayward (historian) (c. 1560 – 1627), English historian
 John Davy Hayward (1906–1965), English editor, critic and anthropologist
 John Warburton (producer) (John Hayward-Warburton), British television producer
 Julia Sampson Hayward, American tennis player
 Justin Hayward, an English singer/songwriter (The Moody Blues)
 Katy Hayward, Northern Irish academic
 Ken Hayward, an Australian politician
 Lance Hayward (1916–1991), Bermudan jazz pianist
 Lawrence Hayward, English musician
 Lazar Hayward (born 1986), American basketball player
 Leland Hayward, Hollywood and Broadway agent and theatrical producer
 Lillie Hayward (1891–1971), American silent film actress
Louis Hayward, British actor
Maurice Hayward (Governor of Bombay) (1923)
Mary Hayward Weir (1915–1968), American steel heiress
Mary E. Smith Hayward (1842–1938), American businesswoman
Max Hayward (1924–1975), British lecturer and Russian translator
Monroe Hayward (1840–1899), U.S. senator
Nantie Hayward, South African cricketer
Nathaniel Hayward (1808–1865), inventor
Nelson Hayward (1810–1857), 6th mayor of Cleveland, Ohio
Paul Hayward, Australian rugby league player
Rachel Hayward, Canadian actress
Ray Hayward, American baseball player
Reggie Hayward, American football player
Reginald Frederick Johnson Hayward (1891–1978), South African Victoria Cross recipient
Richard Arthur Hayward, tribal chairman of the Mashantucket Pequot tribe (1975–1998)
Richie Hayward (1946–2010), American drummer (Little Feat)
Rick Hayward, chairman of English professional football club Wolverhampton Wanderers (2004–2006)
Robert Hayward (disambiguation), several people
Roger Hayward (1899–1979), American artist and architect
Rowland Hayward (c. 1520 – 1593), English merchant and Lord Mayor of London
Rudall Hayward (1900–1974), New Zealand film pioneer
Ruxton Hayward, British eccentric
Sidney Hayward (1897–1961), British barrister
Steve Hayward, English footballer
Steven Hayward, Canadian novelist
Steven F. Hayward, American writer
Susan Hayward, American actress
Thomas Hayward (cricketer) (1835–1876), English cricketer
Thomas Hayward (Royal Navy officer) (1767–1798), Royal Navy Officer
Thomas Hayward (tenor), American tenor
Thomas B. Hayward, U.S. Chief of Naval Operations (1978–1982)
Tim Hayward (born 1963), English food writer and restaurateur
Tom Hayward (1871–1939), English cricketer
Tony Hayward, Former Chief Executive of BP Group
Victor Hayward (1888–1916), English explorer
Victoria Hayward (b. 1992), Canadian softball player
Victoria Hayward (1876-1956), Bermudan-born travel writer and journalist
Wally Hayward (1908–2006), South African endurance athlete
Walter Hayward-Young (1868–1920), British artist
William Hayward (disambiguation), several people
William Hayward Pickering (1910–2004), New Zealand rocket scientist

See also
Heyward

English-language surnames